The Northern Loloish languages, also known as Northern Ngwi, are a branch of the Loloish languages that includes the literary standard of the Yi people. In Lama's (2012) classification, it is called Nisoid (Nisu–Lope), which forms the Nisoish branch together with the Axi-Puoid (Southeastern Loloish) languages.

Languages
Two of the six Yi languages (fangyan 方言) officially recognized by the Chinese government belong to the Northern Loloish branch.
Northern Yi (Nuosu 诺苏)
Eastern Yi (Nasu 纳苏)

Another officially recognized Yi language (fangyan), Southern Yi (Nisu 尼苏), may or may not be a Northern Loloish language, as Pelkey (2011) classifies it as a Southeastern Loloish language based on phonological innovations shared with Southeastern instead of Northern Loloish languages.

Other Northern Loloish languages are listed below.
Aluo is close to Nasu.
Chesu is close to Nasu.
Lope, also known as Awu
Alingpo is close to Nasu and Gepo.
Ku of Qiubei County, Yunnan
Luoji of Weining County, Guizhou
Nong of Huaning County, Yunnan
Xiqi of Huaning County, Yunnan

Nisu is classified as Southeastern Loloish by Pelkey (2011), but is traditionally classified as a Northern Loloish language.

Bradley (1997) also lists the endangered Kathu and Mo'ang languages of Wenshan Prefecture, Yunnan, China as Northern Loloish languages, but they were later classified as Mondzish by Lama (2012) and Hsiu (2014).

Bradley (2007)
Within Northern Loloish, David Bradley (2007) recognizes the Nosoid and Nasoid subgroups. Lama (2012) also recognizes a distinction between the Nuosu and Nasu clusters, with the Nuosu cluster including Nuosu and Niesu, and the Nasu cluster include Nasu, Gepu, and Nesu.

Nosoid
Nuosu (Nosu)
Muhisu
Nyisu
Nasoid
Nasu
Aluo
Naluo
Chesu
Gepo, Ayizi

Samei, Samataw, and Sanie are classified as Nasoid by Bradley (2007), but as Kazhuoish languages by Lama (2012).

Chen (2010)
Chen (2010) recognizes two topolects (Chinese: fangyan 方言), namely Nosu (Northern Yi) and Nasu (Eastern Yi). 

Nosu 诺苏方言 (See)
Nasu 纳苏方言
Nàsū 纳苏次方言
Nàsū 纳苏: 400,000 speakers in Luquan, Wuding, Xundian, Huize, Dongchuan, Songming, etc.
Naso, Nàsuǒ 纳索: 300,000 speakers in Zhaotong, Ludian, Yiliang, Daguan, Yanjin, Suijiang, Yongshan, Qiaojia, Huize, etc.
Alo, Āluó 阿罗: 100,000 speakers in Wuding, Fumin, Lufeng, etc.
Mongi, Mòqí 莫其: 50,000 speakers in Wuding, Luquan, Songming, Kunming, Mile, etc.
Nersu, Nèisū 内苏次方言
Nersu, Nèisū 内苏: 300,000 speakers in Weining, Shuicheng, Hezhang, Nayong, Yiliang, Huize, Xuanwei, Weixin, Zhenyong, etc.
Nipu, Nípǔ 尼普: 300,000 speakers in Bijie, Qianxi, Jinsha, Dafang, Zhijin, Nayong, Qingzhen, Pingba, Puding, Liuzhi, Guanling, Zhenning, etc.
Noso, Nuòsuǒ 诺索次方言
Noso, Nuòsuǒ 诺索: 100,000 speakers in Panxian, Xingren, Pu'an, Xingyi, Qinglong, Shuicheng, Fuyuan, Luoping, etc.
Polo, Bǔluó 补罗: 50,000 speakers in Kaiyuan, Gejiu, Mengzi, Honghe, Wenshan, Yanshan, etc.

Li (2013:245) lists the following autonyms for the Yi people of these counties.
Xide County: 
Luquan County, Xundian County: 
Shilin County: , /
Weining County: 
Dafang County: 
Eshan County: 
Luquan County: 
Pan County: 
Longlin County: 
Liangshan County: , 

Other autonyms listed by Dai (1998:218):
Luquan County:  (Black Yi 黑彝); ; 
Mojiang County: 

The  of southwestern Guizhou reside in Pingdi 坪地, Pugu 普古, and Jichangping 鸡场坪 townships, Pan County; Longchang 龙场 and Fa'er 法耳 township, Shuicheng County (Chen 1987).

Innovations
Pelkey (2011:368) lists the following as Northern Ngwi innovations that had developed from Proto-Ngwi.
Proto-Ngwi tone categories H and L flipped (*L >  (13) in Nasu)
Proto-Ngwi tone categories *1 and *2 merged to mid-level
Proto-Ngwi tone category *3 > low-falling
Lexicalized family group classifiers with frequent monosyllabic forms
Burmic extentive paradigm is highly grammaticalized, with few lexical innovations

References

Bradley, David (1997). "Tibeto-Burman languages and classification". In Tibeto-Burman languages of the Himalayas, Papers in South East Asian linguistics. Canberra: Pacific Linguistics.
Chen Kang [陈康]. 2010. A study of Yi dialects [彝语方言研究]. Beijing: China Minzu University Press.
Lama, Ziwo Qiu-Fuyuan (2012). Subgrouping of Nisoic (Yi) Languages. Ph.D. thesis, University of Texas at Arlington.
Pelkey, Jamin. 2011. Dialectology as Dialectic: Interpreting Phula Variation. Berlin: De Gruyter Mouton.